Rosaire Smith ( – ) was a Canadian male former weightlifter, who competed in the bantamweight class and represented Canada at international competitions. He won the bronze medal at the 1947 World Weightlifting Championships in the 59 kg category. He also competed at the 1948 Summer Olympics and the 1952 Summer Olympics.

References

1914 births
1999 deaths
Canadian male weightlifters
World Weightlifting Championships medalists
Weightlifters at the 1950 British Empire Games
Commonwealth Games medallists in weightlifting
Commonwealth Games silver medallists for Canada
Olympic weightlifters of Canada
Weightlifters at the 1948 Summer Olympics
Weightlifters at the 1952 Summer Olympics
20th-century Canadian people
21st-century Canadian people
Medallists at the 1950 British Empire Games